Caulerpa papillosa is a species of seaweed in the Caulerpaceae family.

In Western Australia, it is found along the coast in the Gascoyne and south as far as Esperance it is also found in South Australia, Victoria and Tasmania.

References

papillosa
Species described in 1873